The Agenda 2010 is a series of reforms planned and executed by the German government in the early 2000s, a Social Democrats/Greens coalition at that time, which aimed to reform the German welfare system and labour relations. The declared objective of Agenda 2010 was to promote economic growth and thus reduce unemployment.

The Agenda
On 14 March 2003, Chancellor Gerhard Schröder gave a speech before the German Bundestag outlining the proposed plans for reform. He pointed out three main areas which the agenda would focus on: the economy, the system of social security, and Germany's position on the world market.

German finance minister Hans Eichel had the responsibility of implementing socially unpopular measures including tax cuts (such as a 25% reduction in the basic rate of income tax), cuts in the cost absorption for medical treatment and drastic cuts in pension benefits, and cuts in unemployment benefits. The measures were ostensibly proposed in accordance with the market liberalisation approach adopted by the EU's Lisbon Strategy. The name Agenda 2010 itself is a reference to the Lisbon Strategy's 2010 deadline.

The plan was strongly promoted by the Bertelsmann media group.

A series of changes in the labour market known as the Hartz plan started in 2003 and the last step, Hartz IV, came into effect on 1 January 2005. These changes affected unemployment benefits and job centers in Germany, and the very nature of the German system of social security.

Reaction

Politicians, industrial leaders, trade unions, media and population consider the Agenda 2010, especially the Hartz IV law, as the largest cut into the German system of social security since World War II.

While industrial leaders and both the conservative and economically liberal parliamentary parties such as the CDU, the CSU, and the FDP strongly supported Agenda 2010 as it implemented their long-time demands, there was a strong upheaval in Schröder's own SPD. After Schröder threatened to resign (with no obvious successor as Chancellor) if the changes were blocked within his party, since they were so vital to his government's policy, he received an inner-party 80% vote of confidence as well as a 90% approval from his coalition partner, the Greens.

The leaders of the Protestant and Roman Catholic churches in Germany took the "highly unusual step" of publicly expressing their support for the government's proposals. "The old methods no longer work", the chairman of the Evangelical church, Manfred Kock, said. The leader of the country's Catholics, Cardinal Karl Lehman, called Schröder's proposals "absolutely necessary".

Schröder had won the 2002 federal election with, among other things, the promise not to cut into the social security system. In reaction to the Agenda's policies and the measures taken, a significant number of members of Schröder's SPD left the party, but the more prominent left-wing politicians stayed on. Although the changes eventually went through, Gerhard Schröder, after adverse opinion polls,  resigned as party chairman (though not as Chancellor) in February 2004, to give way to Franz Müntefering.

This development left the PDS (with only 2 out of the 603 members of the federal parliament) as the only outspoken opponent to the Agenda 2010 policies although their course was somewhat inconsistent. In the Länder of Mecklenburg-Vorpommern and Berlin, where there are SPD-PDS coalitions (and later SPD-Die Linke coalitions), PDS/Die Linke ministers actively implemented Agenda 2010 laws.

The German Trade Union Federation (DGB), the most influential group outside parliament and historically interwoven with the SPD, massively stepped up their discourse against Agenda 2010, especially prior to the Hartz IV law in July 2004, but the rumble subsided quickly after a summit meeting with Schröder in August 2004. The trade unions suffered from a lot of attrition in that process as their members defected in droves either because the unions' attitude was perceived as too lenient or as too strongly opposed. There were no strikes against Agenda 2010 as the German constitution prohibits politically motivated strikes, but some demonstrations at least were organized and supported by the unions.

In December 2003, the Bundesrat, dominated by the opposition CDU party, blocked some of the reforms on political grounds until several compromises were reached, many of which put a particularly painful twist—for those affected, for example the unemployed or the ill—on the measures taken.

Dissatisfaction with Agenda 2010, and in particular with Hartz IV, lead to thousands of people protesting in the streets of Berlin, Leipzig and other big cities particularly in eastern, but also western Germany over the summer of 2004 (see Monday demonstrations, 2004).

Dissent with the Agenda 2010 had also promoted the foundation of a new political party, the Electoral Alternative for Labor and Social Justice (WASG) by long-term SPD members and union activists. The WASG was squarely against the measures taken in the Agenda 2010 process and ran in the 2005 North Rhine-Westphalia state election, where it gained 2.2% of the votes and no seat, against what it considered "the neoliberal consensus" displayed by the governing centre-left political parties and the more conservative opposition alike. For the 2005 German federal election the WASG formed a successful electoral alliance with The Left Party.PDS, which reached 8.7% of the votes. In June 2007 both parties merged to a new party, The Left.

Consequences
The immediate aftermath of the Agenda 2010 reforms was that unemployment rose to over 5.2 million people in February 2005 and Schröder called German companies "lazy" for failing to hire more workers. Beginning in 2005, however, unemployment figures began falling and, in May 2007, unemployment was at 3.8 million people, a 5½ year low. The apparent success of Agenda 2010 in reducing unemployment in Germany has been cited in the debate over extending long-term unemployment insurance benefits in the United States.

A debate about the socioeconomic results of the Agenda 2010 reforms was stirred by the release of a study conducted by the Friedrich Ebert Foundation in late 2006. The study classified 4 percent of people living in West Germany as well as 20 percent of people living in East Germany as living in "precarious" socio-economic conditions. Although the topic of social conditions in Germany was much debated as a result of this study, with many people (including those in Schröder's own party) laying blame on Schröder and his Hartz IV reforms for the growing economic inequality in Germany, no policy changes have been enacted as a direct result of the study.

By 2008, the wage share of national income had reached a 50-year low of 64.5%.

Another sign that economic inequality has risen in Germany can be seen in the fact that the number of Germans living below the poverty line has increased from 11% in 2001, to 12.3% in 2004, and about 14% in 2007. According to 2007 government statistics, one out of every six children was poor, a post-1960-record, with more than a third of all children poor in big cities like Berlin, Hamburg and Bremen.

Voters seemed to respond to the Agenda 2010 and Hartz IV reforms negatively. In the 2004 elections to the EU parliament, the SPD reached an all-time postwar national election low of only 21% of the votes.

The SPD lost by a wide margin in the 2005 regional election in its North Rhine-Westphalia "heartland", where the regional SPD government was replaced by a CDU-FDP coalition, giving the winners a working majority in the Bundesrat, the federal legislature's upper house. The Social Democrats losses were widely attributed to voters' discontent with the Agenda 2010 reforms.

Subsequently, Chancellor Schröder triggered a loss in a confidence vote, which, in turn, necessitated an early general election. In the autumn of 2005, one year ahead of schedule,  general elections were held and the Social Democrats were defeated.

By 2011, unemployment had fallen from its 10% average of the mid-decade to around 7%, its lowest since the early 1990s.

Some scientists see the wage depression in Germany fostered by the Agenda 2010 as one of the causes of the European debt crisis.

See also
 Demographics of Germany
 Politics of Germany

References

Further reading

External links
 A Quick Guide To ‘Agenda 2010’ – Deutsche Welle's English report on the Agenda 2010, 17 Oct 2003

Welfare in Germany
2010 in Germany
Political history of Germany
Economic policy in Europe
Labor in Germany
Reform in Germany
Frank-Walter Steinmeier